Eva Elin Rombo, née Karlsson (born 29 January 1976), is a Swedish operatic soprano. In November 2013 she was named Hovsångerska.

Biography
She then continued her education in Canada at Brandon University, and at Operahögskolan i Stockholm (University College of Opera) where she graduated in 2003. During her studies, she made her stage debut at the Royal Swedish Opera (Kungliga Operan) in Stockholm as Christa in Janáčeks The Makropulos Affair.

At the Royal Swedish Opera, she performed as Barbarina and Susanna in Mozart's Le nozze di Figaro, the First Lady in his Die Zauberflöte, Frasquita in Bizet's Carmen, Sister Blanche in Poulenc's Dialogues of the Carmelites, Musette in Puccini's La bohème, and Donna Elivra in Mozart's Don Giovanni.

Rombo performed several roles at the Frankfurt Opera, amongst others as Servilia in Mozart's La clemenza di Tito, Clorinda in Rossini's La Cenerentola, Pamina in Die Zauberflöte and Corinna in Rossini's Il viaggio a Reims. In the summer of 2009, she made her debut at the Salzburg Festival in the lead role of Luigi Nono's Al gran sole carico d'amore. She then worked at the Berlin State Opera in Bernstein's Candide.

In 2010, she was a soloist in Brahms' A German Requiem with the Chicago Symphony Orchestra. She had the lead role as Agnès in George Benjamin's Written on Skin at the Dutch National Opera in Amsterdam. Rombo performed in SVT's broadcast of the christenings of Princess Estelle and Prince Oscar and at the jubilee concert for the celebration of King Carl Gustaf's 40 years on the Swedish throne. She also performed at the 2014 Polar Music Prize. Rombo played Sister Blanche in Poulenc's Dialogues of the Carmelites in a 2011 production at the Royal Swedish Opera.

In 2010, Rombo became the first person to receive the Schymberg Scholarship award, a scholarship established in memory of Hjördis Schymberg. The scholarship included a prize of 25,000 Swedish krona.

Discography
 Title role in Johann Strauss' operetta , Stockholm Strauss Orchestra conducted by Valéria Csányi. Naxos 8.660227-28. (2 CDs).
 2nd high soprano in Wolfgang Rihm's Dionysos, Deutsches Symphonie-Orchester Berlin conducted by Ingo Metzmacher. DVD. Euro Arts 2072608.

References

External links

Living people
1976 births
Swedish operatic sopranos
People from Katrineholm Municipality
Brandon University alumni
University College of Opera alumni
21st-century Swedish  women opera singers